Danzon is a surname. Notable people with the surname include:

 Marc Danzon, French diplomat and child psychiatrist
 Patricia Danzon, American economist and professor

See also

Danson
Danton (name)
Manzon